Krich is a surname. Notable people with the surname include:

Helen Krich Chinoy, née Helen Krich (1922–2010), American theater historian
Rochelle Majer Krich (born 1947), American novelist

See also
Krick
Rich (surname)